One Is Business, the Other Crime is a 1912 American short silent drama film directed by D. W. Griffith and starring Blanche Sweet. Prints of the film survive in the film archives of the Library of Congress and the Museum of Modern Art.

Cast

See also
 D. W. Griffith filmography
 Blanche Sweet filmography

References

External links

 
One Is Business, the Other Crime available for free download(archive.org)

1912 films
1912 drama films
1912 short films
Silent American drama films
American silent short films
American black-and-white films
Films directed by D. W. Griffith
1910s American films